CitizenM (branded citizenM) is a Netherlands-based, global hotel developer, investor, and hotel chain. It opened its first hotel at Amsterdam Schiphol Airport in 2008, followed by the city of Amsterdam in 2009. Its first overseas hotel in Glasgow opened in 2010, followed by London in 2012. CitizenM has since expanded its portfolio across North America, Europe and Asia.

Company
CitizenM was founded by Rattan Chadha in 2005. The branding and logo was developed by KesselsKramer.

In March 2019, GIC Private Limited acquired a 25% stake in CitizenM, valuing the company at $2.3 billion. KRC, APG, and GIC have committed to invest a further $847 million of equity for future expansion.

Hotel architecture
CitizenM hotels embrace International Style with large glass windows cladding in black metal exterior wall (the hotel in Amsterdam using gray metal), making use of off-site modular construction for many of the components. Some of the locations make use of large scale public art, such as by Julian Opie at Paris Charles de Gaulle Airport.

The public spaces of the hotels feature the "Living Room" furnished with art and furniture from companies such as Vitra, along with artwork and books. The design includes open computer stations where guests check themselves in and out.

The Rotterdam hotel opened in December 2013 and has a double ceiling height, a tree and a wooden staircase in the entrance.

The hotels feature automated self check-in, and also do not employ bellhops.

Locations
The original hotel at Schiphol Airport in Amsterdam was opened in 2008 and was designed by the Dutch architectural company Concrete. With 230 compact  rooms, it is built on a modular basis.

The second hotel opened in Amsterdam's city centre in 2009, and was awarded a Fodor's 100 Hotel Award for Design in 2011.

CitizenM operates over 20 hotels across North America, Europe, and Asia, with 18 new hotels under development globally.

 CitizenM Amsterdam – Schiphol Airport (2008) 355 rooms 
 CitizenM Amsterdam – South (2009) 215 rooms
 CitizenM Glasgow (2010) 198 rooms
 CitizenM London – Bankside (2012) 192 rooms
 CitizenM Rotterdam (2013) 151 rooms
 CitizenM New York – Times Square (2014) 230 rooms
 CitizenM Paris – Charles de Gaulle Airport  (2014) 230 rooms
 CitizenM London – Tower of London (2016) 370 rooms
 CitizenM London – Shoreditch (2016) 216 rooms
 CitizenM Paris – La Defense (2017) 175 rooms
 CitizenM Taipei – Beimen (2017) 267 rooms on 26 floors
 CitizenM Paris – Gare de Lyon (2017) 338 rooms
 CitizenM New York – Bowery (2018) 300 rooms
 CitizenM Copenhagen Radhuspladsen (2018) 238 rooms
 CitizenM Zürich (2019) 160 rooms
 CitizenM Boston North Station (2019) 272 rooms
 CitizenM Shanghai (2019) 303 rooms
 CitizenM Kuala Lumpur (2019) 210 rooms
 CitizenM Amsterdam – Amstel (2019) 88 rooms
 CitizenM Seattle – South Lake Union (2020) 264 rooms
 CitizenM Geneva (2020) 144 rooms
 CitizenM Washington D.C. (2020) 252 rooms
 CitizenM San Francisco (2021) 195 rooms
 CitizenM Los Angeles (2021) 315 rooms
 CitizenM Chicago Downtown (2022) 280 rooms
 CitizenM Seattle Pioneer Square (2022) 216 rooms

References

Hotel chains in the Netherlands